We Are Here is the debut studio album by rock supergroup Apparatjik and was released first on 1 February 2010 for digital download via their official website. A physical CD/DVD release followed and the album was re-released for iTunes, with bonus material, on 15 June 2010.

The album was once again re-released on 14 November 2010 on yellow 12" vinyl with an alternate sleeve and a poster, limited to 260 copies.

Background
The first single from the album, "Electric Eye", was released for digital download on 30 November 2009. The song was released again as a double-A-side single with "Antlers" for 7 inch vinyl on 8 February 2010. Apparatjik's first song to be played on BBC Radio 1 was a radio edit of "Datascroller", which aired on 14 June 2010. This was released as the third single on 19 July 2010 as a download only.

The album cover artwork is derived from a diagram related to spacetime theories in the field of special relativity within physics, and follows with the band's overall image as being a "species of their own from another planet".

Track listing

Personnel
Apparatjik
Jonas Bjerre – lead vocals, guitar
Magne Furuholmen – vocals, guitar, keyboards
Guy Berryman – vocals, bass
Martin Terefe – vocals, drums, production

References

External links

Eye On Committee Website
Official Apparatjik YouTube Page
Apparatchick: Unofficial Apparatjik Fan Site

2010 debut albums
Apparatjik albums